Biskupskie Drogi  (German: Strassenkrug) is a settlement in the administrative district of Gmina Radłów, within Olesno County, Opole Voivodeship, in south-western Poland.

References

Biskupskie Drogi